Ursus and the Tartar Princess (also known as Tartar Invasion) is a 1961 Italian-French peplum film written and directed  by Remigio Del Grosso and starring Yoko Tani and Ettore Manni.

Plot
The young Polish prince Stephen goes on a mission together with the mighty Ursus, but they are captured by the Tartars.

During the days of his captivity Stefano falls in love with Ilia, a Tatar girl daughter of the chief. But the girl is already promised to the son of the Great Khan, so a duel arises between the two rivals.

The Tartar is mortally wounded, so Ursus, Stefano and Ilia take the opportunity to flee to the Polish camp where a battle soon breaks out, in which Stephen's people win.

Cast
Yoko Tani as Princess Ila 
Ettore Manni as Prince Stefan
Joe Robinson as Ursus
Roland Lesaffre as Ivan 
Maria Grazia Spina as Amia 
Akim Tamiroff as Khan of the Tartars 
Tom Felleghy as Suleiman 
Andrea Aureli as Ibrahim
Ivano Staccioli as Prince Ahmed 
Gianni Solaro as Polish War Leader

References

External links

Ursus and the Tartar Princess at Variety Distribution

1960s fantasy adventure films
Peplum films
Sword and sandal films
French fantasy adventure films
Italian fantasy adventure films
1960s Italian-language films
1960s French films
1960s Italian films